The 2021 South Alabama Jaguars football team represented the University of South Alabama during the 2021 NCAA Division I FBS football season. The Jaguars played their home games at Hancock Whitney Stadium in Mobile, Alabama. They competed in the West Division of the Sun Belt Conference.

Prior to the season, South Alabama saw a near complete overhaul of its coaching staff, including Kane Wommack taking over as head coach, Major Applewhite taking over as offensive coordinator, and Corey Batoon taking over as defensive coordinator.

Previous season
The Jaguars finished the 2020 season with a 4–7 record (3–5 in conference), finishing second in the Sun Belt West Division. South Alabama was not invited to any postseason competition. Following the season, head coach Steve Campbell was fired after amassing a record of 9-26 and no winning seasons over his three seasons at the helm of the program. Kane Wommack was named head coach soon after.

2021 NFL Draft

Preseason

Recruiting class

|}
Source:

Award watch lists
Listed in the order that they were released

Preseason

Sources:

Sun Belt coaches poll
The Sun Belt coaches poll was released on July 20, 2021. The Jaguars were picked to finish third in the West Division.

Sun Belt Preseason All-Conference teams

Offense

1st team
Jalen Tolbert – Wide Receiver, JR

Defense

2nd team
Keith Gallmon – Defensive Back, JR

Personnel

Schedule
The 2021 schedule consists of 6 home and 6 away games in the regular season. The Jaguars will travel to Sun Belt foes Texas State, Louisiana–Monroe, Troy, and Appalachian State. South Alabama will play host to Sun Belt foes Louisiana, Georgia Southern, Arkansas State, and Coastal Carolina.

South Alabama will host two of the four non-conference opponents at Hancock Whitney Stadium, Southern Miss of the Conference USA and Alcorn State, from NCAA Division I FCS Southwestern Athletic Conference, and will travel to Bowling Green of the Mid-American Conference and Tennessee of the Southeastern Conference.

Game summaries

Southern Miss

at Bowling Green

Alcorn State

Louisiana

at Texas State

Georgia Southern

at Louisiana–Monroe

Arkansas State

at Troy

at Appalachian State

at Tennessee

Coastal Carolina

References

South Alabama
South Alabama Jaguars football seasons
South Alabama Jaguars football